Ali Şen (26 December 1918 in Adana, Ottoman Empire – 15 December 1989 in Istanbul, Turkey) was a Turkish actor, father of the actor Şener Şen. He played many roles both as protagonist and antagonist.

Filmography

External links

1918 births
1989 deaths
People from Adana
People from Adana vilayet
Turkish male film actors
20th-century Turkish male actors